Colonel William Hope VC (12 April 1834 – 17 December 1909) was a Scottish recipient of the Victoria Cross, the highest and most prestigious award for gallantry in the face of the enemy that can be awarded to British and Commonwealth forces.

William Hope was the son of the Right Honourable John Hope, Lord Chief Justice Clerk of Scotland, and his wife Jessie Irving, and was born in Edinburgh on 12 April 1834. He was educated privately and at Trinity College, Cambridge.

William Hope married Margaret Jane, daughter of Robert Cunningham Cunninghame Graham of Gartmore and aunt of the author, politician and traveller Robert Bontine Cunninghame Graham, by whom she had six children, the eldest of which was a son, Adrian, whose granddaughter, Lauretta Hope-Nicholson, was the second wife of the artist Jean Hugo.

VC action
He was 21 years old, and a lieutenant in the 7th Regiment of Foot (later The Royal Fusiliers), British Army during the Crimean War when the following deed took place for which he was awarded the VC.

On 18 June 1855 at Sebastopol, Crimean Peninsula, Lieutenant Hope went to the assistance of the adjutant, who was lying outside the trenches badly wounded.  Having found that it was impossible to move him, even with the help of four men, he ran back across the open ground under very heavy fire from the enemy batteries, and procured a stretcher to bring the wounded officer in.

He later achieved the rank of colonel. Hope invented a form of shrapnel shell for rifled guns, and later became an enthusiastic supporter of the volunteer movement, rising to the command of the 1st City of London Artillery Volunteers.

The Medal
His Victoria Cross is displayed at the Royal Fusiliers Museum in the Tower of London, England.

Business
Following his military career, Hope was involved in a number of business ventures. In 1862 he was described as General Manager of the International Financial Society, and was also Director of the Lands Improvement Company, through which he had been involved in reclamation and irrigation work in Spain and Majorca. The estimated cost of the project was £2.1 million, and although work started in 1865, a crisis in the banking system, when the Overend Gurney bank failed, made it difficult to obtain finance, and the scheme foundered.

References

Monuments to Courage (David Harvey, 1999)
The Register of the Victoria Cross (This England, 1997)
Scotland's Forgotten Valour (Graham Ross, 1995)

External links
Location of grave and VC medal (Brompton Cemetery)
 
 Blue Plaque

1834 births
1909 deaths
Military personnel from Edinburgh
Alumni of Trinity College, Cambridge
Crimean War recipients of the Victoria Cross
British Army personnel of the Crimean War
British recipients of the Victoria Cross
Royal Fusiliers officers
Burials at Brompton Cemetery
William
Volunteer Force officers
British inventors
British Army recipients of the Victoria Cross